Parsloes Park is a 58 hectare public park in Dagenham in the London Borough of Barking and Dagenham. It is owned and managed by the borough council. A small area opposite the Wren Road entrance is managed for wildlife and designated as a Local Nature Reserve called Parsloes Park Squatts.

The park derives its name from the Passelewe family, who owned the land in the thirteenth century. Paintings of the old manor house are held in the Valence House Museum.

The land was acquired by the London County Council in 1923. The park was opened by MP Christopher Addison on 13 July 1935, marking the official completion of the Becontree estate. It has a children's play area, football pitches, tennis courts, a basketball court, a bowling green, and a lake. Parsloes Park Squatts is an area of rough acid grassland with a historic hedge.

In the 1930s, the stretch of the Gores Brook which flowed through Parsloes Park was channelled through a pipe and buried. The brook now runs in culvert for approximately 430 meters under the eastern section of the Park. In 2022, Thames21 supported by the Mayor of London’s Green and Resilient Spaces fund, announced plans to deculvert the stretch of Gores Brook running through the park.

There are entrances in Parsloes Avenue, Gale Street and Wren Road.

Parsloes is also a ward of the London Borough of Barking and Dagenham. The population of the ward at the 2011 Census was 9,839.

References

External links

Nature reserves in the London Borough of Barking and Dagenham
Local nature reserves in Greater London
Parks and open spaces in the London Borough of Barking and Dagenham